Eric Talbot is an American comic book writer and artist known for his work on the Teenage Mutant Ninja Turtles series under Mirage Studios. He was hired by long-time classmate and friend Kevin Eastman. 

Talbot is a professional Tattoo artist working at Oxbow Tattoo in Easthampton MA

Talbot co-created the graphic novel The Melting Pot along with Kevin Eastman and Simon Bisley, which was used as the basis for the film Heavy Metal 2000.

References

External links

  Eric Talbot ON INSTAGRAM
 www.erictalbotart.com
 https://www.oxbowtattoo.com/

American comics artists
Mirage Studios
Year of birth missing (living people)
Living people